Menacuddle is a historic place, holy well and wooded area in St Austell, Cornwall, UK.

The holy well was built in the 15th century and restored by Admiral Sir Charles John Graves-Sawle shortly after the First World War in memory of his son who was killed in action. It is a popular spot with ramblers. Its name is recorded as Menequidel in 1250 and Menedcudel in 1284 and comes from the Old Cornish mened and cuydel and it means hillside with a small wood. The name does not include a saint's name, and there was no St Guidel. The site has also been known as Pinni-menny.

It is said that if a person drops a pin into the well and makes a wish, that wish will be granted. The woods have a reputation for being haunted, with sightings of a "huge black beast" there.

The site is a monument scheduled under the Ancient Monuments and Archaeological Areas Act 1979, NHLE list number 1019163.

References

Religion in Cornwall
Buildings and structures in Cornwall
Reportedly haunted locations in South West England
Holy wells in Cornwall